Battle of Fei may refer to:

Battle of Fei (233 BC) (肥之戰), fought between the Qin and Zhao states in 233 BC
Battle of Fei River (淝水之戰), fought between Former Qin and Eastern Jin Dynasty in AD 383